North Masson Range is part of the Masson Range, which is divided into three parts of which this segment is the northern, rising to 1,030 m and extending 3 nautical miles (6 km) in a north–south direction. The Masson Range was discovered and named by British Australian New Zealand Antarctic Research Expedition (BANZARE), 1929–31, under Mawson. This northern range was mapped by Norwegian cartographers from air photos taken by the Lars Christensen Expedition, 1936–37, and named Nordkammen (the north comb or crest). The approved name, suggested by Antarctic Names Committee of Australia (ANCA) in 1960, more clearly identifies the feature as a part of Masson Range.

Mountains
Painted Peak
Rumdoodle Peak

References

Mountain ranges of Mac. Robertson Land